"Shawty Is a 10" (also known uncensored as "Shawty Is Da Shit") is the debut single from American singer, songwriter and record producer The-Dream's debut studio album, Love/Hate. The track is written and produced by The-Dream alongside longtime collaborator Carlos McKinney.

Remixes
The song has three remixes. The first, featuring Fabolous, was only intended to be used in the video; however, it was chosen for the album version as well. The second remix, featuring R. Kelly and a new verse by The-Dream, was released on July 10, 2007; this version was released as the official remix. The third "extended remix" features Aaliyah, Kid Cudi, Keri Hilson and Aasim.

Swedish pop duo jj included a cover version of the song on their 2012 EP High Summer, titled "10".

Music video
The video premiered on BET's 106 & Park on September 10, 2007. Cameo appearances include Jazze Pha, Mariah Carey, Keri Hilson, DJ Khaled and Yung Joc.

Charts

Weekly charts

Year-end charts

Certifications

References

2007 debut singles
The-Dream songs
Fabolous songs
Music videos directed by Ray Kay
Songs written by The-Dream
2007 songs
Def Jam Recordings singles